The 1912 Carlisle Indians football team represented the Carlisle Indian Industrial School as an independent during the 1912 college football season. Led by 11th-year head coach Pop Warner, the Indians compiled a record of 12–1–1 and outscored opponents 454 to 120, leading the nation in scoring. It featured the Hall of Famers Jim Thorpe, Joe Guyon, and Gus Welch. Dwight D. Eisenhower was a halfback on the Army team defeated by Carlisle.

The 1912 season included many rule changes such as the 100-yard field and the 6-point touchdown.  The first six-point touchdowns were registered in Carlisle's 50–7 win over Albright College on September 21.

Schedule

Players

Line

Backfield

References

Carlisle
Carlisle Indians football seasons
Carlisle Indians football